The FAI Cup 1929/30 was the ninth edition of Ireland's premier cup competition, The Football Association of Ireland Challenge Cup or FAI Cup. The tournament began on 4 January 1930 and concluded on 17 March with the final held at Dalymount Park, Dublin. An official attendance of 17,000 people watched Shamrock Rovers claim the second of five FAI Cup titles in a row by defeating Brideville with a controversial late goal.

First round

Second round

Semi-finals

Replay

Final

Notes
A.  From 1923 to 1936, the FAI Cup was known as the Free State Cup.

B.  Attendances were calculated using gate receipts which limited their accuracy as a large proportion of people, particularly children, attended football matches in Ireland throughout the 20th century for free by a number of means.

C.  Fixture abandoned due to bad weather. Re-Fixture played on 8 January.

References
General

External links
FAI Website

1929-30
1929–30 in Irish association football
FAI Cup